World champions in athletics may refer to:

List of World Athletics Championships medalists (men)
List of World Athletics Championships medalists (women)